Kundo may refer to:

 A German manufacturer of torsion pendulum clocks in the early 20th century
 Kundo: Age of the Rampant, a 2014 South Korean film
 Kundō Koyama, a Japanese writer
 Kundo, a deity in the fictional World of Greyhawk